Totomi may refer to:

 Tōtōmi Province, a pre-Meiji province of Japan on the territory of present-day Shizuoka Prefecture
 Totomi, a game by Finnish studio Rovio Entertainment